Amplicincia is a genus of moths in the subfamily Arctiinae described by William D. Field in 1950.

Species
 Amplicincia fletcheri Field, 1950
 Amplicincia lathyi Field, 1950
 Amplicincia mixta Möschler, 1886
 Amplicincia pallida Butler, 1878
 Amplicincia walkeri Field, 1950

References

Lithosiini
Moth genera